Lorna Dyer (born July 3, 1945) is an American ice dancer. With partner John Carrell, she is the 1967 U.S. national champion. They are the 1967 World silver medalists and 1965–1966 World bronze medalists.

After retiring from competitive skating, Lorna graduated from the University of Washington with a degree in Biology and married Jerry Watts. Lorna taught high school science for over 30 years, and was the Washington State Outstanding Biology Teacher of the year and was a candidate for the 1985 NASA Teacher in Space. She spent summer breaks in Sun Valley, Idaho teaching skating.  In 1980, she wrote "Ice Dancing Illustrated", an instructional book of technical information for dance compulsories learned from coach Jean Westwood. She is retired and resides in Santa Fe, New Mexico with her husband.

Results
(with King Cole)

(with John Carrell)

References

American female ice dancers
Living people
1945 births
World Figure Skating Championships medalists
Sportspeople from Seattle
21st-century American women